A ratio is a relationship between numbers or quantities.

Ratio may also refer to:
Ratio (journal), a philosophical quarterly
Ratio, Arkansas, a community in the United States
Ratio decidendi, a legal concept
Ratio Institute, a Swedish institute
 Ratio scale, a statistical level of measurement
 Ratio, a 2009 book on cooking by Michael Ruhlman
 'Ratio' as a term used on the social media website Twitter

See also